El Caballito may refer to:

 El Caballito (Mexico City Metrobús), a BRT station in Mexico City
 El Caballito (Sebastián), a sculpture in Mexico City
 Equestrian statue of Charles IV of Spain, a sculpture in Mexico City
 The Boy on the Seahorse, Puerto Vallarta, Mexico